Collegeland is a semi-rural area in north County Armagh, Northern Ireland. Most of the settlement is within the townlands of Aghinlig and Keenaghan, near the village of Charlemont and just across the River Blackwater from  Moy, County Tyrone, within the Armagh City, Banbridge and Craigavon Borough Council area. It had a population of 122 people (42 households) in the 2011 Census.

The area is known as "Collegeland" (or "College Land") because it was formerly the property of Trinity College, Dublin. In 1859, the lease of the Collure estate (as it was then known) was inherited at his father's death by John Howard Parnell, elder brother of Charles Stewart Parnell. In 1879, John Parnell,  financially strapped, offered his subtenants terms on which to purchase their own farms, according to the "John Bright Clauses" of the Landlord and Tenant (Ireland) Act 1870.

Sport
The village is home to Collegeland O'Rahilly's Gaelic Athletic Club. They won the Armagh junior championship in 2007 by beating Clady in Armagh (final scores Collegeland 1:09 Clady 0:09).

People
Paul Muldoon - Poet and academic; professor of Creative Writing at Princeton University

References

See also
List of towns and villages in Northern Ireland

Villages in County Armagh